The West Woodstock Bridge is a historic steel bridge, carrying Mill Road across the Ottauquechee River in the village of West Woodstock, Vermont.  Built in 1900, it is the oldest documented Pennsylvania through truss bridge in the state.  It was listed on the National Register of Historic Places in 1992.

Description and history
The West Woodstock Bridge stands just north of Woodstock Union High School, spanning the Ottauquechee River east of U.S. Route 4 (US 4) in an east–west orientation. It is a single-span Pennsylvania through truss, a variant of the Pratt truss with additional vertical members, and its elements are connected by pins instead of rivets. The deck consists of rolled I-beam stringers with wooden flooring. Elements of bridge exhibit modest Victorian styling.

The bridge was fabricated by the Groton Manufacturing Company of New York, and is one of two bridges in the state known to be manufactured by them. The company had originally offered the town an already-built structure intended for a different location in New York at a discount price, but was forced to build a new structure at a loss when the first was retained by the first municipality at a different location. The bridge abutments are believed to stand on foundations dating to 1789.

See also
List of bridges on the National Register of Historic Places in Vermont
National Register of Historic Places listings in Windsor County, Vermont

References

Road bridges on the National Register of Historic Places in Vermont
National Register of Historic Places in Windsor County, Vermont
Bridges completed in 1900
Bridges in Windsor County, Vermont
Buildings and structures in Woodstock, Vermont
Steel bridges in the United States
Pennsylvania truss bridges in the United States